Claas Epp Jr.  (21 September 1838 – 19 January 1913) was a Russian Mennonite minister known for leading his followers into Central Asia where he predicted Christ would return in 1889.

Life
Epp was born in Fürstenwerder, Prussia. His family moved to the Trakt Mennonite settlement in the Russian province of Samara in 1853. He was married to Elisabeth Jantzen in 1862. Most of their twelve children died before reaching adulthood. His son, Claas Epp III migrated to Beatrice, Nebraska, in 1891, and his numerous descendants live in the United States.

The 1870s were a time of stress and transition in the Mennonite settlements of Russia. The population of the colonies was more than could be supported by available land. The Russian government announced in 1870 that it would end all special privileges granted to colonists by 1880, including the exemption from military service, which was so important to nonresistant Mennonites. Those most concerned with these changes were looking toward North America as a resettlement option. There was widespread distribution of chiliastic writings by prophetic authors such as Jung Stilling and others among the Mennonite colonies.

It was in this uncertain environment that Epp distributed a self-published book in 1877 in which he put forth his own prophetic interpretation of the Bible. Epp predicted that Christ would return in 1889 and meet the faithful in central Asia. According to Epp, his own congregation was Philadelphia of the seven churches of the Book of Revelation, which would become a doorway into heaven.

As 1880 and the end of special privileges approached, a group of Epp's followers prepared for a trek east. A party traveled to Saint Petersburg where they obtained permission to settle near Tashkent from Konstantin Petrovich Von Kaufman, the first Governor-General of Russian Turkestan. Over a hundred families in four groups set out in summer and fall of 1880, arriving in the vicinity of Tashkent after an arduous fifteen-week journey. When they learned that the military exemption now no longer applied to Russia's Asiatic possessions, a disagreement arose among the group.

Epp took his group of some sixty families to Bukhara, hoping to be out of the reach of Russian jurisdiction and the associated conscription requirements. The emir of Bukhara refused to accept the settlers,  sending Epp and his followers back into Turkestan. After much traveling back and forth in the border area of Bukhara and Turkestan, the group was invited to settle near the Laudan canal on the upper Amu Darya river in the Khanate of Khiva.

Their journey was at its end, but new problems arose. When nearby bandits learned that the Mennonites would not defend themselves their thievery advanced from taking horses and livestock to boldly coming into homes and taking possessions at will. As the violence escalated, a young Mennonite man was murdered, straining the group's nonviolent values. The khan offered a permanent solution by inviting the Mennonites to relocate in a walled garden called Ak Metchet a dozen kilometers southeast of Khiva.

Epp became ever more fanatical. He predicted Christ's return on 8 March 1889. When the date came and nothing happened, Epp adjusted his calculations — claiming the original date was based on a leaning clock — and corrected the year to 1891. That year passed and Epp, ever more eccentric, declared himself to be Christ's son. His congregation dwindled over the decades. Epp died in 1913 in Ak Metchet, two days after his wife's death. The community survived until 1935, and is considered by historians as a successful Mennonite settlement that was dissolved under the Soviet collectivization program.

Notes

References

Further reading

 Dueck, A. J. "Claas Epp and the Great Trek Reconsidered." Journal of Mennonite Studies 3 (1985): 138-147.
 Dyck, Frederick D. "In their own Words, A Short Sketch of my Life:Jacob Toews (1838 - 1922)." Mennonite Family History (Jan. 2007): 34-49 (Toews participated in the migration to Asia).
 Juhnke, James C. "Rethinking the Great Trek." Mennonite Life 62, no. 2 (2007).
 Ratliff, Walter R. "Last Oasis: The Mennonite Refuge in Khiva." Mennonite Life 63, no. 1 (Spring 2008) (Details the final years of Ak Metchet).
 Unger, Walter. "Mennonite Millennial Madness: A Case Study." Direction 28, no. 2 (1999): 201-217.

External links
Interactive Map of the Mennonite Great Trek
Satellite photo of Ak Metchet, Khiva

1838 births
1913 deaths
Russian Mennonites
Prussian Mennonites
Mennonite ministers
19th-century Anabaptist ministers
Cult leaders